Magnetic induction tomography is an imaging technique used to image electromagnetic properties of an object by using the eddy current effect. It is also called electromagnetic induction tomography, electromagnetic tomography (EMT), eddy current tomography, and eddy current testing.

Applications
The method is used in nondestructive testing and geophysics, and has potential applications in medicine. It is also used to generate 3D images of passive electromagnetic properties, which has applications in brain imaging, cryosurgery monitoring in medical imaging, and metal flow visualization in metalworking processes.

References

 Peyton, A. J., et al. "An overview of electromagnetic inductance tomography: description of three different systems." Measurement Science and Technology 7.3 (1996): 261.

Magnetic resonance imaging